The 2019 Big 12 Conference softball tournament will be held at ASA Hall of Fame Stadium in Oklahoma City, Oklahoma from May 10 through May 11, 2019. The tournament winner will earn the Big 12 Conference's automatic bid to the 2019 NCAA Division I softball tournament. All games of the tournament aired on Fox College Sports, the championship game will air on FS2. Due to Weather conditions, the last 4 games of the Big 12 Tournament were canceled. Therefore the Automatic bid was given to the regular season champion which would be Oklahoma.

Standings
Source:

 Baylor did not participate in the tournament

Tournament
Sources:

Pool A
No. 4 Texas Tech vs. No. 6 Kansas
No. 4 Texas Tech wins 7-3

No. 1 Oklahoma vs. No. 4 Texas Tech
No. 1 Oklahoma wins 8-0

No. 1 Oklahoma vs. No. 6 Kansas
Canceled

Pool B
No. 2 Oklahoma State vs. No. 3 Texas
No.2 Oklahoma State wins 6-2

No. 3 Texas vs. No. 5 Iowa State
No. 5 Iowa State wins 2-0

No. 2 Oklahoma State vs. No. 5 Iowa StateNo. 2 Oklahoma State wins 17-2Championship Day
Pool A 3rd Place vs. Pool B 3rd PlaceCanceledPool A 2nd Place vs. Pool B 2nd PlaceCanceledPool A 1st Place vs. Pool B 1st PlaceCanceled'''

Schedule
Sources:

Fox College Sports games were simulcast in Big 12 country on Fox Sports Southwest, Fox Sports Oklahoma, Fox Sports Midwest, and Fox Sports Kansas City (or their Plus stations when Major League Baseball conflicts arose).

References

Big 12 Conference softball tournament
Tournament
Big 12 softball tournament